NWR may refer to:

Organizations
 National Women's Register, a network of women's discussion groups
 New World Resources, a European coal mining company
 Newman Wachs Racing, an American auto racing team
 NOAA Weather Radio, a network of radio stations broadcasting weather information in the US
 North West Radio, former radio station that broadcast 1989–2004 in parts of Ireland

Other uses
 National Wildlife Refuge, a protected area of the US managed by the US Fish and Wildlife Service
 Nawaru language (ISO 639:nwr), spoken in Papua New Guinea
 North Western Railway (disambiguation)
 Nicolas Winding Refn, a Danish movie maker.

See also
 L&NWR (London and North Western Railway)